Elections to Colchester Borough Council took place on 3 May 2018. Seventeen members of the council - one-third of the whole - were elected, one from each of the seventeen wards. It was the first standard election to take place following comprehensive boundary changes in 2016. This set of seats were last up for election in 2016, with the third-placed elected candidates being up for election in 2018.

Summary
The four main parties put up a full slate of candidates and Independents stood in eight wards.

Result

Composition
Prior to the election, the composition of the council was:

After the election, the composition of the council was:

New Administration
The Liberal Democrats, Labour Party, and Independent groups reached a deal that would continue their coalition, with Cllr Mark Cory to replace the unseated Paul Smith as Leader of the Council.

Ward results

Berechurch 

No UKIP candidate as previous (−12.8).

Castle

Greenstead

No UKIP candidate as previous (−14.8)

Highwoods

No UKIP candidate as previous (−9.1).

Lexden & Braiswick

Marks Tey & Layer

No UKIP candidate as previous (−17.6).

Mersea & Pyefleet

No UKIP candidate as previous (−21.4).

Mile End

New Town & Christ Church

Old Heath & The Hythe

Prettygate

Rural North

Shrub End

No UKIP (−13.8) or Independent (−12.7) candidates as previous.

St. Anne's & St. John's

No UKIP candidate as previous (−20.6).

Stanway

Tiptree

Wivenhoe

No Independent candidate as previous (−13.6).

References

2018 English local elections
2018
2010s in Essex